Shahida may refer to:
Female form of the word Shahid or martyr
Shahida (died 1938), an Armenian, one of the wives of Saudi king Abdulaziz Ibn Saud, reportedly his favourite wife, mother of princes Mansour, Mishaal, Mutaib and princess Qumash  
Shahida (film), a 1949 Pakistani film